The 1990 NCAA Division II football season, part of college football in the United States organized by the National Collegiate Athletic Association at the Division II level, began in August 1990, and concluded with the NCAA Division II Football Championship on December 8, 1990, at Braly Municipal Stadium in Florence, Alabama, hosted by the University of North Alabama. The North Dakota State Bison defeated the Indiana (PA) Crimson Hawks, then known as the Indians, 51–11, to win their fifth Division II national title.

The Harlon Hill Trophy was awarded to Chris Simdorn, quarterback from North Dakota State.

Conference and program changes
One program departed Division II for Division I-AA prior to the season.
The Midwest Intercollegiate Football Conference (MIFC) was founded prior to the season by the football-playing members of the Great Lakes Intercollegiate Athletic Conference (six teams) and the Heartland Collegiate Conference (five teams). As such, the GLIAC abandoned its sponsorship of football and the Heartland disbanded.

Conference standings

Conference summaries

Postseason

The 1990 NCAA Division II Football Championship playoffs were the 18th single-elimination tournament to determine the national champion of men's NCAA Division II college football. The championship game was held at Braly Municipal Stadium in Florence, Alabama, for the fifth time.

Playoff bracket

See also
1990 NCAA Division I-A football season
1990 NCAA Division I-AA football season
1990 NCAA Division III football season
1990 NAIA Division I football season
1990 NAIA Division II football season

References